Stephanie Bendrat (born 5 March 1991) is an Austrian athlete competing in the sprint hurdles. She represented her country at the 2016 World Indoor Championships without advancing from the first round.

International competitions

Personal bests

Outdoor
100 metres – 11.69 (+0.9 m/s, Südstadt 2015)
200 metres – 24.61 (-0.2 m/s, Amstetten 2016)
100 metres hurdles – 13.11 (0.0 m/s, St. Pölten 2016)

Indoor
60 metres – 7.41 (Linz 2016)
60 metres hurdles – 8.13 (Linz 2015)

References

External links
Official site

1991 births
Living people
Austrian female hurdlers
Austrian female sprinters
Competitors at the 2017 Summer Universiade